The Yangzhou Jianzhen International Half Marathon (Chinese: 扬州鉴真国际半程马拉松赛) is an annual road running competition over the half marathon distance  which takes place in April in Yangzhou, People's Republic of China.

The event is named in honour of Jianzhen, a Chinese monk from the city who propagated Buddhism in Japan in the 8th century. The event was first held in 2006 and grew exponentially in its first six years: it gained IAAF Silver Label Road Race status in 2010 and began to attract elite and amateur runners alike. Almost 3000 runners finished the half marathon in 2011, while the introduction of a 10K fun run that year saw 25,000 runners take part in the day's event. The race is predominantly Chinese, although 230 foreign athletes were present in 2011. East African athletes typically occupy the higher places in the elite races.

The very flat, point-to-point course is certified by the Association of International Marathons and Distance Races. The city-centre course begins and ends at the Stadium of Yangzhou Sport Center and passes many of the city's landmarks, including the Wenchang Pavilion, Daming Temple and the Yangzhou Museum.

The men's course record of 59:52 minutes (set in 2015 by Mosinet Geremew) is the fastest ever recorded in China. The women's record holder is Peres Jepchirchir, with her winning time of 1:07:21 from 2016.

Past winners
Key:

References

External links
Official website

Half marathons
Recurring sporting events established in 2006
Athletics competitions in China
Sport in Yangzhou